William H. Clark may refer to:

William Harold Clark (1869–1913), Canadian politician
Sir William Henry Clark (1876–1952), British civil servant and diplomat
William Hawley Clark (1919–1997), bishop of the Episcopal Diocese of Delaware
W. H. Clark (brewer) (William Henry Clark), brewer in South Australia
William Harvey Clark, member of the 104th New York State Legislature

See also
William Clark (disambiguation)